Judah Kyriakos, also known popularly as Judas of Jerusalem, was the great-grandson of Jude, brother of Jesus, and the last Jewish Bishop of Jerusalem, according to Epiphanius of Salamis and Eusebius of Caesarea. He is sometimes regarded as the great-grandnephew of Jesus.

Though the start of his period as bishop of Jerusalem is not known, Judas is said to have lived beyond the Bar Kokhba's revolt (132–136), up to about the eleventh year of Antoninus Pius (c. AD 148) though Marcus was appointed bishop of Aelia Capitolina in 135 by the Metropolitan of Caesarea.

He is also mentioned in the apocryphal Letter of James to Quadratus.

References

2nd-century bishops of Jerusalem
Family of Jesus
Jude, brother of Jesus
Judean people